Côn Đảo National Park is a natural reserve area on Côn Đảo Island, in Bà Rịa–Vũng Tàu province in coastal southeastern Vietnam. The park includes a part of the island and the surrounding sea. The national park is characterized by a diverse ecosystem. Many species of corals as well as sea turtles, dolphins, and endangered dugongs are found here. In 2006, a delegation of UNESCO Vietnam representatives surveyed the area and concluded that the park is eligible to be a natural-cultural mixture World Heritage. The Vietnamese government is preparing necessary documents to submit to UNESCO soon. A controversial paved road project had been proposed by the local government but was finally rejected by the national government following protests from environmental activists. In 2017 work on the road began and it is still under construction (02/2018).

See also 
Protected areas of Vietnam

References 

National parks of Vietnam
Geography of Bà Rịa-Vũng Tàu province
Protected areas established in 1993